Cycling in Melbourne, the capital city of Victoria, Australia, is enhanced by the city's relatively flat topography and generally mild climate. The city has an active cycling culture for commuting, recreation, fitness and sport, and the metropolitan area has an extensive network of off-road bicycle paths, as well as designated bicycle lanes on many streets.

As in most Western cities, commuter cycling in Melbourne saw a dramatic decline in popularity during the 20th century with the coming of mass car-ownership and the resulting urban sprawl, metropolitan Melbourne being one of the lowest density major cities in the world. In addition to this, the introduction of mandatory helmet legislation (MHL) in the state of Victoria in the early 1990s, the first such legislation in the developed world, further exacerbated the decline in cycling's popularity (see below). However, in the 21st century, cycling for health, fitness, and as a non-polluting alternative to the automobile has begun to increase in popularity once again, though still not back to the pre-MHL levels: cycling's transport modal share accounts for less than 2% of all trips throughout the Melbourne metropolitan area, though bicycles comprised 16% of all morning peak-hour commuter vehicles entering the CBD in March 2017 – up from 9% in March 2008.

Though Melbourne has been named the Economist Intelligence Unit's "most liveable city" many times, the existing cycling infrastructure in Melbourne is often very much inferior in terms of providing safety for cyclists and far less ubiquitous compared to the bicycle-friendly cities of Western Europe. Since 2000, the Victorian state government and local municipalities have become more favourable to investing in cycling infrastructure projects, but expenditure on a per capita basis fluctuates year to year according to whichever state government or councils are in power at the time, and it generally remains low compared to the most bicycle-friendly international cities. Regardless, improvements to CBD cycling routes and other major arterial routes throughout the rest of the metropolitan area continue to be made.

History

19th century

During the worldwide bike boom of the 1890s, cycling was seen an exciting new option for transport taken up eagerly by many people. The craze for cycling in the 1890s is portrayed in the poem Mulga Bill's Bicycle by Australian poet Banjo Paterson, and many other ballads from the time. For women at the time, cycling provided the opportunity of more freedom and being able to wear less restrictive clothing, or rational dress.

Cycling clubs and societies were established in the 1880s and 1890s. In 1885, the Victorian Cyclists Union (VCU) was active, and the League of Victorian Wheelmen (LVW) was formed in 1893. Various notables of the era were members, such as University of Melbourne Professor of Engineering William Charles Kernot who was vice-president of the LVW for a time.

In the 1890s, cycle races like the Austral Wheel Race, and later the Melbourne to Warrnambool Classic, were very popular forms of entertainment, drawing crowds of many thousands. The first women's road race in Victoria occurred in Melbourne on Saturday 16 May 1896 on a hilly  course through the northern suburbs of Northcote, Heidelberg, Ivanhoe, Alphington and Clifton Hill.

20th century
Cycling provided an enduring activity for ordinary Melburnians until falling automobile prices and growing consumer affluence saw increasing numbers switch over to the car in the 1940s and 1950s. Up until the 1940s the bicycle was an important commuter vehicle for many Melbourne people. Post war affluence saw a decline in cycle commuting, and the bicycle was largely relegated to a children's or teenager's activity or for sporting or recreational use.

1970s

It was not until the 1970s that cycle commuting and cycle touring started being widely promoted and used again. Prominent in bicycle advocacy in Melbourne in the 1970s and 1980s was journalist and author Keith Dunstan.

From the 1970s onwards, cycling in Melbourne and the rest of Victoria was stimulated by a number of factors:

 The establishment of the Melbourne Bicycle Touring Club (MBTC) in October 1973. The MBTC aims to promote cycle touring and a healthy, active lifestyle. It has a fundamental commitment to public transport, making extensive use of the country and suburban train networks to get to and from the rides it runs.
 The Bicycle Institute of Victoria (later known as Bicycle Victoria, and now gone nationwide and known as Bicycle Network) started in 1975 with its first president being Keith Dunstan, as a broad appeal membership organisation to campaign for improved facilities and recognition of cyclists. , Bicycle Network had grown to 50,000 members across Australia.
 Innovative supported tours by Friends of the Earth to Canberra to protest uranium mining – the FoE Rides Against Uranium – in 1975, 1976, and 1977.
 Australia's first bicycle plan instituted in the late 1970s in Geelong.
 Growing general environmental awareness of pollution, negative impact of automobiles, and protest at the construction of inner city freeways.

1980s
In the 1980s, the first triple chainring, or granny gears, bicycles started being sold. Ron Shepherd, an engineer and founding member of the MBTC and Bicycle Institute of Victoria relentlessly promoted use of triple cranks to promote cycle touring among a wider audience.

In 1984, Bicycle Institute of Victoria organised the first Great Victorian Bike Ride with 2,100 participants, commonly regarded as the largest single touring bike ride in the world at that time.

1990s
In 1990, Bicycle Victoria organised the launching of its first local government-based bicycle advocacy affiliates, the so-called Bicycle User Groups (BUGs), in Melbourne. , these BUGs are still going strong, but often no longer closely affiliated with Bicycle Victoria (Bicycle Network).

In July 1990, mandatory helmet laws were first introduced in Victoria, the first state in Australia to do so. Victoria's mandatory helmet laws have been the matter of intense debate, both locally and internationally, over the years (see below).

In 1993, Bicycle Victoria launched the inaugural  Around the Bay in a Day ride around Port Phillip Bay. This event, which in 2006 attracted more than 14,000 participants, is still held every October.

The St Kilda Rd bike lanes have routinely been the object of severe safety criticism, mainly for forcing cyclists to ride in the door zone of parked cars.

In 1994, Bicycle Victoria inaugurated Australia's first Ride2Work Day. Ride to Work Day has now spread nationwide.

In November 1995, the first Melbourne Critical Mass was held. This has become a popular regular event with cyclists meeting in front of the State Library of Victoria at 5.30 pm on the last Friday of every month to ride around the city in safety as one mass. They are accompanied on a regular basis by Victoria Police's Bicycle Squad. Generally the police do not interfere in the event but act to facilitate its smooth movement to reduce any obstruction and to calm the antagonism of some car drivers.

21st century

In 2004, the Royal Automobile Club of Victoria (RACV) introduced a Bike Assist membership option, to assist cyclists with punctures or basic repairs.

In 2008, regulation was introduced banning the carriage of bicycles on suburban trains during peak periods. However, this was rescinded several months later after an outcry from bicycle users.

In June 2010, a bicycle hire system called Melbourne Bike Share commenced operations, while another, oBike, launched in June 2017.

In 2014, the Australian Cyclists Party ran candidates in the Victorian state election in several electorates of the Victorian Legislative Council (upper house); though unsuccessful in getting into office, this is believed to be the first election contested by a dedicated party for cycling issues in the world.

Bicycle Network runs annual Ride2Work and Ride2School days to stimulate, with some success, cycle commuting. This is assisted by the formation of many workplace Bicycle User Groups (BUGS). The success of Ride2Work Day has since seen it become a national event.

Melbourne's cycling network
 

Bicycles mostly ride on the road with cars; some have bike lanes, most don't. There are also numerous shared bike paths (with pedestrians) and bicycle-only paths around Melbourne.

Policy and legislation affecting cycling in Melbourne is increasingly directing state government agencies to recognise cycling as a mainstream transport mode which offers significant sustainability and health benefits. The 2010 Transport Integration Act sets a policy framework for creating a more integrated and sustainable transport system for Victoria including Melbourne and contains features which support improved conditions for cyclists. For example, the Act charges the state road agency, VicRoads, with managing the "...road system in a manner which supports a sustainable Victoria by seeking to increase the share of public transport, walking and cycling trips as a proportion of all transport trips in Victoria..."

Bicycle share programs
Between 2010 and 2019 the government ran the Melbourne Bike Share program, the first public bicycle sharing system in Australia. On completion the system consisted of 53 docking stations with 676 bikes situated around the Melbourne CBD. The total cost was estimated at $5.5 million over four years. The system was operated by the Royal Automobile Club of Victoria and the US firm Alta Bicycle Share, which runs bicycle share systems in four North American cities. In 2019, the Melbourne bike share program was scrapped by the Victorian State Government due to low usage, with an average of one ride per day towards the end of the program. Some claimed this was due to the state's mandatory helmet laws.

Currently Melbourne does not have a docked bicycle share program, but does have dockless electric bike and electric scooter share programs in inner-Melbourne run by private companies Lime and Neuron. The e-bikes and e-scooters can use bike lanes, are speed-restricted and can only operate within the City of Melbourne, City of Port Philip and City of Yarra local government areas.

Cycling as a sport 

Victoria has produced many cycling athletes of world renown. Sir Hubert Opperman, "Oppy" (1904–1996), is perhaps the most well known and internationally recognised Australian cyclist of the 1920s and 1930s. As an Australian sportsman, his feats in cycling are compared with Sir Donald Bradman in cricket. He won the 1928 Bol D'or 24-hour race and the 1931 Paris–Brest–Paris  marathon in record time of 49 hours 23 minutes. Many of his long-distance records stood for many years. In France and Australia he was feted as a sporting hero, with thousands attending a parade in his honour in Melbourne 1928.

Post-World War II, Geelong cyclist, Russell Mockridge, was widely described as "Australia's greatest all-round cyclist for all time". Due to his upper class accent he was initially dubbed Little Lord Fauntleroy, however his race wins soon earned him the nickname of The Geelong Flyer. Tragically, he was killed by a bus in 1958 participating in the  Tour of Gippsland. He was just  from the start of the race at the Dandenong Rd / Clayton Rd intersection in Melbourne.

Cycle racing continues to be popular in Melbourne with the Herald Sun Tour, since 1952, bringing professional cyclists from around the world for a multi-stage race around regional Victoria and Melbourne.

, more than 25,000 cyclists, including triathletes and many elite riders, use Beach Road and the Nepean Highway from Black Rock to Mount Eliza on a typical weekend. Each Saturday morning the Hell Ride, a large bunch ride leaves from Black Rock at 7 am. The Hell Ride is a politically contentious topic both amongst Melbourne cyclists and the broader community: most formal cycling organisations discourage their riders from participating, including Cycling Victoria.

A large number of local cycling clubs organise amateur-level racing, with criteriums mostly held in the summer and the road racing season in the winter months. Coburg Cycling Club, based in the Melbourne northern suburb of Coburg, is one of Australia's oldest cycling clubs. It was established as a social club in March 1896 by members of the St. Paul's church choir on Sydney Road. Members quickly found themselves participating in all levels of cycle sport. Many cyclists from the Coburg Cycling Club rose to prominence including Ivor 'Snowy' Munro, Ernie Bainbridge, Richard 'Fatty' Lamb, and the 1956 Olympian Richard 'Dick' Ploog.

Cycling rules and regulations

Cyclists have the same rights and responsibilities as other road users, but some specific rules do apply.

Bicycle parking and theft
Bicycle theft is a problem in Melbourne.

Official road rules (Rule 166. Application of Part to bicycles) regarding bicycle parking appear to state that bicycles should only be parked in supplied cages or parking rails. In practice these facilities are not always available and affixing the bike to street poles is common and does not seem to be penalised.

Public transport
Carriage of bicycles is free on all suburban and regional trains, the latter subject to space availability. Folding bicycles meeting specific criteria are permitted onboard trams and buses; all other bicycles are not allowed.

Bicycle racks on buses were trialled in a 12-month trial from April 2016 to April 2017 on bus routes 510 and 512, along with two regional routes. , the results from the trial have not been published.

Bicycle parking at train stations 
Bicycle parking at Melbourne's train stations for what is known as Bike + Ride travel, can be problematic. A secure bicycle parking place needs to be pre-arranged or you risk bicycle theft or vandalism by parking a bike out in the open.

, secure Parkiteer bicycle parking stations are installed at 78 of Melbourne's 207 train stations. Prospective users of the Parkiteer scheme must register with Bicycle Network for access to a specific Parkiteer cage and, if a vacancy is available, pay a $50 refundable deposit for an electronic access card which enables access for that cage only.

Some Melbourne train stations, including those with Parkiteers, have bike lockers which can fit a single bike in them. If a spare locker is available it can be rented for free for up to three months at a time, but a bond must be paid.

If you have not pre-arranged access to a Parkiteer spot or to a bike locker, most train stations also have bicycle hoops or something similar, but often there are not enough hoops available and train travellers are forced to lock their bikes to railings, signposts, fences, or other fixed objects.

Cycling equipment
Wearing of a helmet at all times, a working bell, and suitable lighting if riding at night are enforced by law.

Effects of cycle helmet legislation 

Victoria's 1990 compulsory cycle helmet legislation was the first in the developed world, and – as with the other Australian states – it is believed to have had a strong negative impact on cycling modal share and modal share growth and recovery in Melbourne. Surveys carried out at the same 64 observation sites in May 1990 and May 1991 detected 29% fewer adults and 42% fewer child cyclists, with an overall reduction in cyclists of 36%. Further falls were recorded to May/June 1992, with teenage cycling reportedly showing a 46% decrease from pre-law levels. The limited injury reductions recorded among Melbourne cyclists did not match the actual decline in cycling. This has led some experts to the conclusion that the law has actually resulted in increased rates of injury among Melbourne's cyclists. The law has also reportedly resulted in significant police efforts against cyclists. As of 2003, Victoria Police were still issuing around 20,000 Bicycle Offence Penalty Notices a year. Since the law, cycling in Melbourne has never been able to recover its previous share of the transport split. In 1985–6, 3.4% of trips in Melbourne were by bicycle, 2004 data showed a decline to 2.0%. The experience of Melbourne's cyclists has given added impetus to the efforts of cyclists in Europe and elsewhere to resist, or repeal, such helmet laws.

Bicycle organisations and groups

 Bicycle Network – a self-funded health promotion charity, owned collectively by all of its members. Bicycle Network works to build more cycling infrastructure, organises their popular "Great Rides", co-ordinates programs such as Ride2Work and Ride2School and provide practical and legal information to achieve their aim of "More People Cycling More Often". Members receive benefits that include crash cover and support, Ride On a bi-monthly full-colour magazine, and help Bicycle Network to advocate for improved riding conditions for all bike riders.
 Australian Cycle Alliance – an Australia-wide cycling advocacy group founded in Melbourne.
 There are many Bicycle User Groups around the Melbourne metropolitan area, usually located in, and committed to working in, a single local government area or other locality.
 Melbourne Critical Mass
 The Bike Shed at CERES teach bike maintenance.

See also

Cycling in Geelong 
Cycling in Victoria
Cycling in Australia
Cycling Victoria - the peak governing body for organised competitive and recreational cycling within Victoria

References

External links

Government sites
Cycling information at VicRoads
the Principal Bicycle Network (PBN)
Cyclist safety laws and advice
 Victorian Cycling Strategy – an overview from Victoria's Department of Transport

Non-government sites
Open Cycle Map and other maps combined
Bike paths guide
Melbourne Bicycle Touring Club
Melbourne bike routes @ bikely.com
Bicycles Network Australia – cycling discussion forums
Westgate Punt at onlymelbourne.com.au
The BikeShed at CERES – The BikeShed is a volunteer on-site group at CERES in the Melbourne suburb of Brunswick East. The BikeShed's aim is to promote cycling in the local community by teaching people how to fix their own bikes. They also sell 2nd-hand bikes which the buyer fixes with their assistance and tools.
Where to Ride Melbourne cycling guide books

 
Melbourne